The Battle of Paye was a battle during the Philippine–American War between the United States and the Philippines. It was fought on January 31, 1900, at Sitio Paye near Barangay Balimbing in the town of Boac, Marinduque. The short skirmish happened between the reconnaissance forces of Company A, 29th USV under the command of 1st Lieutenant Willam S. Wells and the guerrila forces of the 2nd Guerilla under the command of Captain Teofilo Navaroso Roque.

References

Battles of the Philippine–American War
History of Marinduque
1900 in the Philippines
July 1900 events
Conflicts in 1899